Euxestus erithacus is a species of well polished beetle in the family Euxestidae. It is found in North America, Oceania, and Europe.

References

Further reading

 

Coccinelloidea
Articles created by Qbugbot
Beetles described in 1863